Western District was a command of the British Army.

History

Early formation
Great Britain was divided into military districts on the outbreak of war with France in 1793. The role of Western District Commander, which was doubled hatted with that of Lieutenant-Governor of Plymouth, was based at Government House, Mount Wise in Devonport. In January 1876 a ‘Mobilization Scheme for the forces in Great Britain and Ireland’ was published, with the ‘Active Army’ divided into eight army corps based on the District Commands. This scheme disappeared in 1881, when the districts were retitled ‘District Commands. By the 1890s the command included the counties of Cornwall, Devon and Somerset and all of South Wales.

In 1901 Western District was grouped with South East District at Dover and Southern District at Portsmouth under Second Army Corps at Salisbury. 2nd Army Corps was renamed Southern Command in 1905.

Reformation
The district was formed from 48th (South Midland) Division as part of the Territorial Army Volunteer Reserve in 1967. It had its headquarters at Copthorne Barracks, and was placed under the command of HQ UK Land Forces in 1972. In the early 1980s West Midlands District became "Western District". In 1991, the first of the minor districts to be amalgamated were North West District, the former West Midlands District (by then Western District) and Wales, to form a new Wales and Western District. It was disbanded again on the formation of HQ Land Command in 1995.

General Officers Commanding
General officers Commanding included:
Western District
1793 – 1803 Colonel John Campbell
1803 – 1812 Major-General Richard England
1812 – 1819 Major-General Gore Browne
1819 – 1823 Major-General Sir Denis Pack
1823 – 1833 Major-General Sir John Cameron
1835 – 1840 Major-General Sir Willoughby Cotton
1840 – 1842 Major-General Robert Ellice
1842 – 1852 Major-General Sir Henry Murray
1853 – 1854 Major-General Sir Harry Smith
1855 – 1859 Major-General George Eden
1859 – 1865 Major-General William Hutchinson
1865 – 1866 Lieutenant-General Viscount Templetown
1866 – 1869 Lieutenant-General Sir Augustus Spencer
1869 – 1874 Major-General Sir Charles Staveley
1874 – 1877 Lieutenant-General Henry Smyth
1877 – 1880 Lieutenant-General the Hon. Leicester Smyth
1880 – 1883 Lieutenant-General Thomas Pakenham
1883 – 1885 Major-General James Sayer
1885 – 1889 Major-General Thomas Lyons
1889 – 1990 Major-General Sir Howard Elphinstone
1890 – 1895 General Sir Richard Harrison
1895 – 1899 Lieutenant-General Sir Frederick Forestier-Walker
1899 – 1905 Lieutenant-General Sir William Butler

West Midlands District
1967–1968 Major-General Peter Gillett
1968–1970 Major-General Graham Mills
1970–1973 Major-General James Majury
1973–1976 Major-General Robert Britten
1976–1979 Major-General Peter Downward
Western District
1979–1982 Major-General Anthony Ward-Booth
1982–1983 Major-General Richard Keightley
1983–1986 Major-General Brendan McGuinness
1986–1989 Major-General Robert Ward
1989–1991 Major-General Peter Bonnet
Wales and Western District
1991–1994 Major-General Michael Regan
1994–1995 Major-General Ian Freer

References

Districts of the British Army
Military units and formations established in 1793
Military units and formations disestablished in 1905
Military units and formations established in 1972
Military units and formations disestablished in 1991